Joey Pollari (born April 9, 1994) is an American actor who became well known for his role as Eric Tanner on ABC's second season of American Crime, and in 2018, appeared in the film Love, Simon, as Lyle, one of Simon's potential boyfriends. In 2020, Pollari released an album, About Men, under the stage name Odd Comfort.

Personal life
Pollari was born in St. Paul, Minnesota. He started his acting career when he attended a scouting event in downtown Minneapolis with his mother. He received callbacks the next day from agents who wanted to represent him. Pollari has appeared in stage productions at the Guthrie Theater in Minneapolis, the Ordway Center for the Performing Arts in Saint Paul, and the SteppingStone Theatre for Youth Development, also in Saint Paul. He is gay, having come out at eighteen to friends and family.

Career
On April 30, 2006, Pollari appeared as a newsboy in "The Hen House", an episode of the police procedural television series Cold Case. The Walt Disney Company cast him in Skyrunners, a 2009 Disney XD Original Movie about two brothers who stumble upon a spaceship that is sought after by the FBI agents and space aliens. The film, which was shot in New Zealand, premiered on Disney XD on November 27, 2009. Pollari was 15 years old when it first aired. His co-star in the film, Kelly Blatz, a long-time friend of Pollari, said Pollari grew "like a foot taller and his voice changed and everything" during the filming of Skyrunners. Joey currently resides in Hollywood. In 2014, Pollari co-starred beside YouTuber Joey Graceffa in a short film called Ethereal, a short film that Graceffa made and posted on his channel on October 16.

In 2018, Pollari had a supporting role in the teen romantic comedy Love, Simon as Lyle, one of Simon's potential boyfriends. In 2019, he appeared in another gay-themed film, The Obituary of Tunde Johnson.

In 2020, Pollari released an album, About Men, under the stage name of Odd Comfort. In a June 2020 interview, Pollari said that he is still open to acting roles, but his immediate plans are releasing another album and directing music videos.

Filmography

Film

Television

References

External links

1994 births
21st-century American male actors
American male child actors
American male film actors
American male television actors
Living people
American people of Finnish descent
American gay actors
Male actors from Minnesota
People from Ramsey County, Minnesota